Duke Gong may refer to:

Duke Gong of Cao (died 618 BC)
Duke Gong of Chen (died 614 BC)
Duke Gong of Qin (died 604 BC)